Shri Pratapa  was Khayaravala king in 13th century. There are  inscription of Shri Pratapa in Rohtas of Vikram Samvat 1279. According to inscription he defeated a "Yavana" army; the "Yavana" here probably refers to a Muslim general. According to the inscription of Rohtas Fort, Shri Pratapa was  descendant and successor of Pratapdhavala.

References

13th-century Indian monarchs